The Exclusive Books Boeke Prize is a book prize which was awarded in South Africa from 1995 to  2012.

Award
The award was loosely modelled on the United Kingdom's Booker Prize, and sponsored by Exclusive Books. Although boeke is an Afrikaans word, the plural form of the word for "book", the Boeke Prize has only been awarded to novels written in English.

Launched in 1995, the award was made mostly to first novels or works: 12 of the first 19 winners were debut works. The books were judged by a panel of book critics (40 in 2008).

Ten of the books to receive the award have had a film adaptation released.

Winners

Judges' Award

Exclusive Books Fanatics choice

See also
Amstel Playwright of the Year Award
M-Net Literary Awards
Exclusive Books

References

South African literary awards
Fiction awards
Awards established in 1995
South African literary events